"Misery and Gin" is a song written by Snuff Garrett and John Durrill, and recorded by American country music artist Merle Haggard.  It was written specifically for inclusion in the 1980 movie, Bronco Billy, and released as a single in June 1980.  It was co-released both on the Bronco Billy soundtrack album and Haggard's studio album, Back to the Barrooms.  "Misery and Gin" reached number 3 on the Billboard Hot Country Singles & Tracks chart and peaked at number 4 on the Canadian RPM Country Tracks.

Content
The narrator discusses how he always ends up at the bar trying to drink away memories. The narrator goes on to say how the alcohol makes memories come back to haunt him.

Chart performance

Other versions
Billy Dean covered "Misery and Gin" on his 1994 LP Men'll Be Boys.

References

1980 singles
Merle Haggard songs
Billy Dean songs
Songs written by Snuff Garrett
MCA Records singles
1980 songs